The 2007 Motorola Indy 300 was a race in the 2007 IRL IndyCar Series, held at Infineon Raceway. It was held over the weekend of 24 -August 26, 2007, as the fifteenth round of the seventeen-race calendar.

Classification

References 
IndyCar Series

Motorola Indy 300
Indy Grand Prix of Sonoma
Motorola Indy
Motorola Indy